Ceylalictus taprobanae is a species of bee in the genus Ceylalictus, of the family Halictidae.

References
 https://www.itis.gov/servlet/SingleRpt/SingleRpt?search_topic=TSN&search_value=757433
 http://www.atlashymenoptera.net/page.asp?id=94
 https://web.archive.org/web/20150210172336/http://halictidae.lifedesks.org/pages/29776
 https://www.gbif.org/species/1352692

Halictidae
Hymenoptera of Asia
Insects of Sri Lanka
Insects described in 1897